The 22nd Bangladesh National Film Awards, presented by Ministry of Information, Bangladesh to felicitate the best of Bangladeshi Cinema released in the year 1997. The ceremony took place in Dhaka and awards were given by then President of Bangladesh. The National Film Awards are the only film awards given by the government itself. Every year, a national panel appointed by the government selects the winning entry, and the award ceremony is held in Dhaka. 1997 was the 22nd ceremony of National Film Awards.

List of winners
This year artists received awards in 15 categories. No awards were given in Best Lyrics, Best Female Playback Singer, Best Cinematography, Best Dialogue, and Best Editing categories in 1997.

Merit awards

Technical awards

Special awards
 Best Feature Film - Jibon O Ovinoy

See also
 Bachsas Film Awards
 Meril Prothom Alo Awards
 Ifad Film Club Award
 Babisas Award

References

External links

National Film Awards (Bangladesh) ceremonies
1997 film awards
1998 awards in Bangladesh
1998 in Dhaka